Vikramkhol or Bikramkhol cave is a prehistoric archaeological site known for prehistoric inscriptions.

Location
Vikramkhol cave is located near Jharsuguda, Odisha, India and lies in Reserved Forest of Belpahar range, at a distance of 12 km from Belpahar.

Inscriptions
The inscriptions at Vikramkhol cave are written on an uneven rock surface in a natural rock shelter using red Ochre paint which is later incised into the rock. The inscriptions were discovered around the 1930s and first studied by Dr K P Jayaswal. who tentatively dates it 1500 BC. There are two theories regarding the inscription – one declares it a writing, while others doubt it as a rock art and nonliterate rock carvings

Theory of literate script
According to Jayaswal, the prehistoric scribblings at Vikramkhol represent a picto-syllabic writing system which represents a mixture of Harappan and Brahmi hence forming a connection between the two. The inscribed portion covers an area of 35 feet by 7 feet, The evidences which support it as a writing system are as follows;

 The characters are carefully painted and then inscribed which has parallels with Brahmi rock inscriptions
 The writings are in regular lines (not always regular due to rough rock surface)
 the symbols have set forms which disclose ‘writing habits in the phraseology of handwriting experts. The hand which first painted the letters was used to writing with a pen as evidenced from a certain portion of the inscription.
 The system knows the bindu, and also, probably, the visarga. Some letters have dots placed below them, while in some cases dots seem to give a discriminative value to the letters, as in Semitic writing.
 The right-hand corner top line on Plate 8, where the same symbol is repeated more  than once, may point to the employment of numerals.
 It is evident that some of the letters disclose accentuation. Repetition of the  same letter twice probably suggests consonantal duplication or conjuncts.
 The writing seems to have reached the syllabary (alphabetic) stage.

Other scholars such as Naresh Prasad Rastogi state that Its date of the Vikramkhol inscription is still debatable and its letters deserve a more searching scrutiny

Non literate system
Scholars such as Richard Salomon have completely dismissed the Vikramkhol cave inscriptions as pseudo inscriptions According C.L Fabri, the topsy turvy incised signs may have some resemblance with Brahmi script but may not represent writing but possibility of a primitive rural writing cannot be denied either

Neglect
Some historians have felt that, due to negligence and apathy by Government agencies, the inscriptions are fading out and damaged by vandals. Activities of coal mines in surrounding hills, industries like sponge iron are putting environmental pressure on this prehistoric archaeological site. The rock shelter, where the inscriptions are found, is not fully protected and kept open to atmosphere, giving scope for vandals and visitors to deface the inscriptions. As it is located inside Reserve Forest of Belpahar range, the remote access to the place has also contributed to neglect by Government Agencies.

Other Inscriptions 
Another set of proto Brahmi or pre historic inscriptions have been found at Garjan Dongar in Sundergarh district, and Ushakothi in Sambalpur district in Orissa.

References

Archaeological sites in Odisha
Prehistoric art
Rock art in India
Caves containing pictograms in India
Rock shelters
Jharsuguda district
Caves of Odisha